This is a list of Canadian films which were released in 2004:

See also
 2004 in Canada
 2004 in Canadian television

External links
Feature Films Released In 2004 With Country of Origin Canada at IMDb
Canada's Top Ten for 2004 (list of top ten Canadian feature films, selected in a process administered by TIFF)
 List of 2004 box office number-one films in Canada

2004
2004 in Canadian cinema
Canada